This is a list of all cricketers who have captained Hong Kong in an official international match. This includes One Day Internationals and ICC Trophy games. The table is correct as of Hong Kong vs Pakistan on July 18, 2004.

One Day International

Hong Kong played their first ODI on  July 24, 2004.

T20 International

Hong Kong played their first T20I on  July 24, 2014.

Under-19s

Hong Kong played their first T20I on July 24, 2014.

ICC Trophy

Hong Kong debuted in the ICC Trophy in the 1982 tournament

References

External links
Cricinfo page on Hong Kong ODI captains
Hong Kong Cricket Association
Hong Kong's ICC Trophy captains at Cricket Archive 

Hong Kong in international cricket

Cricket
Hong Kong